Edward Salisbury may refer to:

 Edward James Salisbury (1886–1978), English botanist and ecologist
 Edward E. Salisbury (1814–1901), American Sanskritist

See also 
 Edward of Salisbury, nobleman and courtier